Nuriye Akman (born 1957) is a Turkish journalist, columnist, and novelist who is especially known for her interviewing prominent figures in Turkish politics and culture. 

She was detained as part of the investigation into the military coup attempt on 15 July 2016,  subsequently arrested 30 August 2016 and released pending trial on 12 October 2016. On 6 July 2018, Akman was acquitted of all charges.

Career

After working as a clerk for Sümerbank for three years, she became a journalist for Milliyet in 1982. Between 1985 and 1993 she worked at Hürriyet and between 1993 and 2002 at Sabah newspapers. In 2004, he gave a lecture on interviewing techniques at Bahçeşehir University. She produced and anchored programs  İnci Avcısı for the Turkish Radio and Television Corporation (TRT) and Empati for SkyTürk. More recently, Akman anchors the TRT Haber program Akılda Kalan.

Akman has written three novels and published a collection of her interviews. Akman's brother is publisher Ali Ural of Şule Publications. She is the mother of one child.

Works 

 Nefes (novel)
 Örtü (novel)
 Kim (novel)
 İnci Avcısı
 Mebus Burcu
 Kalabalıklar
 Başka Sorum Yok

 Üzümünü Ye Bağını Sor
 Gurbette Fethullah Gülen 
 Yüzleşme / Açlık Grevinde 205 Gün
 Mayın Tarlası / Sınırı Zorlayan Sorular
 Elli Kelime / Adnan Menderes'ten Berin Menderes'e Yassıada Mektupları

References

External links 
 Official website

1957 births
Living people
Turkish columnists
Turkish women columnists
Political writers
Censorship in Turkey
Journalists imprisoned in Turkey
Writers from Istanbul
Turkish women journalists
Turkish women novelists